Victor Allen Bolden (born May 6, 1965) is a United States district judge of the United States District Court for the District of Connecticut and former Corporation Counsel for the City of New Haven, Connecticut.

Biography

Bolden received an Artium Baccalaureus degree in 1986 from Columbia University. He received a Juris Doctor in 1989 from Harvard Law School. He began his legal career as a Marvin Karpatkin Fellow, from 1989 to 1990, and then as a staff attorney at the American Civil Liberties Union Foundation, from 1990 to 1994. He served as Assistant Counsel at the NAACP Legal Defense and Educational Fund, from 1994 to 2000. From 2000 to 2005, he worked at the law firm of Wiggin & Dana, where he handled a wide variety of commercial litigation matters. From 2005 to 2009, he returned to the NAACP Legal Defense and Education Fund as General Counsel. From 2009 to 2014, he served as Corporation Counsel for the City of New Haven, Connecticut.

Federal judicial service

On June 16, 2014, President Barack Obama nominated Bolden to serve as a United States District Judge of the United States District Court for the District of Connecticut, to the seat vacated by Judge Janet Bond Arterton, who assumed senior status on July 1, 2014. On July 29, 2014 a hearing on his nomination was held before the United States Senate Committee on the Judiciary. On September 18, 2014 his nomination was reported out of committee by a 10–8 vote. On November 18, 2014 Senate Majority Leader Harry Reid filed for cloture on his nomination. On Wednesday November 19, 2014, the United States Senate invoked cloture on his nomination by a 51–44 vote. On Thursday, November 20, 2014, Bolden was  confirmed by a 49–46 vote. He received his judicial commission on November 21, 2014.

See also 
 List of African-American federal judges
 List of African-American jurists

References

External links

1965 births
Living people
African-American judges
African-American lawyers
Columbia College (New York) alumni
Connecticut lawyers
Harvard Law School alumni
Judges of the United States District Court for the District of Connecticut
United States district court judges appointed by Barack Obama
21st-century American judges